Nærbø Station is a railway station located at Nærbø in Hå, Norway on Sørlandet Line. The station is served by the Jæren Commuter Rail between Stavanger and Egersund, and one of the two bihourly train services as Nærbø as its terminal station.

References

Railway stations on the Sørlandet Line
Railway stations in Hå
Railway stations opened in 1878
1878 establishments in Norway